Sándor is a Hungarian given and family name.

Sandor may also refer to:

Places
Sandor, Maharashtra, India, a census town 
Sandor, Thane, Maharashtra, India, a village (possibly the same place as the above)

Fictional characters
Sandor, a character in the film Dracula's Daughter
Sandor, a character in the book series Lorien Legacies by Pittacus Lore
Sandor, a character in the animated TV series Star Blazers
Emperor Sandor, a recurring character of the Tara Duncan book series who is consort to Empress Lisbeth Brami of the empire Omois on Otherworld, paternal half-uncle to the titular character, and elder half-brother of the late Emperor Danviou Brami. 
Sandor Clegane, nicknamed The Hound, a character in the fantasy series A Song of Ice and Fire and its television adaptation Game of Thrones
Sandor, a recurring character as Sophie Foster's bodyguard in the book series Keeper of the Lost Cities by Shannon Messenger